The Roxxon Energy Corporation (otherwise known as the Roxxon Oil Company, Roxxon Oil Corporation, Roxxon Corporation or simply Roxxon) is the name of a fictional massive petroleum industrial conglomerate in the Marvel Universe appearing in American comic books published by Marvel Comics. The company is depicted as having been run by various executives who are typically ready and eager to use any underhanded and illegal option to secure profits, up to and including violent crimes. As such, Roxxon is a consistent opponent of various superheroes.

The company has appeared in various media adaptations as well as many television shows and films set in the Marvel Cinematic Universe.

Publication history
The Roxxon Energy Corporation first appeared in Captain America #180 (December 1974), and was created by Steve Englehart and Sal Buscema.

Fictional company history
Originating sometime during the early 20th century as Republic Oil & Gas Co. and having rebranded itself at various times, Roxxon has been run by various executives who are ready and eager to use underhanded and illegal option to secure profits, has its own army-like security task force, and has employed a number of special agents. Roxxon has encountered numerous superheroes, such as Captain America, Iron Man, Spider-Man, and the Black Panther.

The Roxxon conglomerate's central division is Roxxon Oil. The company currently wholly owns the Kronas Corporation and the Metrobank while the Brand Corporation is another for-profit company that has specialized in creating superhumans and is usually considered a subsidiary that has sometimes made its own decisions and acted independently.

Roxxon has also regularly been at odds regarding energy sources with Project Pegasus, which has been involved in alternative energy research that could hurt Roxxon's oil profitability.

Roxxon is also shown to have previously had a mining operation on Mars, but (due to unexplained circumstances) halted the operation and erased all traces of everyone involved.

Roxxon Energy Corporation (alongside Alchemax and Hammer Industries) was mentioned to have once tried to bid on the renovated Baxter Building only to be outbid by Parker Industries.

Roxxon is revealed to be orchestrating the young superheroes being falsely outlawed by the public. Having acquired the dragons from War of the Realms event, their first step was to get rid of the high schooler Aliana Kabua. Although Kamala Khan got injured from saving Aliana, Roxxon begin to shift the blame to the Champions for the damage they never started. While forming a partnership with Senator Geoffrey Patrick and C.R.A.D.L.E., Roxxon manipulates them into unknowingly furthering their shady businesses, such as permanent imprisonment, brainwashing and unethical experimentation, as well as possibly kidnapping of the kids who oppose the unjust law. Viv Vision, who survived Roxxon's assault on Aliana, had been monitoring her fellow younger superheroes, but discovers that she is unintentionally selling her friends to C.R.A.D.L.E. and Roxxon. Once the Champions reveals Roxxon's conspiracy to Senator Patrick and the public, the senator finally begins to repeal the unjust law, ending the partnership with Roxxon, and clearing Kamala's name while re-evaluating his business dealings. Later, Miles Morales and Sam Alexander go undercover as interns, prior to being suggested to hire Kamala Kahn. While Roxxon attempts to cover up their illegal activity by releasing a social app called "Roxx-On", a Champion and a former prisoner of C.R.A.D.L.E.'s harassment, Snowguard rallies a group of mobs because they still openly do not trust Roxxon for their previous activities. Much worst, Roxxon already hired Ironheart's nemesis from Stark Unlimited, Andre Sims, in an attempt to collect data to dispose of those who are deemed threats to its business. He replaced young superheroes with his Chaperon robots to ensure the unjust Kamala's Law remains active. During Roxx-On concert, Roxxon lost its public trust thanks to Kamala's public speech about the company's ongoing shady business, thus repealing Kamala's Law and disbanding C.R.A.D.L.E.. However, Roxxon's reputation becomes worst when Andre attempts to dispose of young people like the Champions because of his personal issues, but is immediately stopped by Roxxon's higher-up Miriam Blakemoore. After that, Roxxon finally makes a public speech to apologize for their actions and takes responsibility for Andre's crime.

Subsidiaries
 Republic Oil and Gas Company - Roxxon's predecessor. 
 Brand Corporation - A scientific research and development firm which has conducted many projects for the federal government. The Brand Corporation also worked in robotics and interdimensional exploration.
 Cybertek Systems Inc. - A cybernetic research division of Roxxon that serves as its prosthetic and robotics facility. It was later enhanced to reverse-engineer the cyborg Deathlok.
 Kronas Corporation - A company that was founded by Aleksander Lukin.
 Metrobank -

Members

Executives
 Pierce Benedict - Director of seagoing operations.
 Douglas Bravner - Sunturion Project executive.
 August D'Angelo - Chairman of the board of directors.
 Jonas "Jonah" Hale - Director of Research, as well as the former chief operations director of Roxxon's predecessor, the Republic Oil and Natural Gas. His schemes were ruined by Iron Man, the first was mining a small island in the Atlantic Ocean with vibranium, and the second was while as a supervisor of The Star Well I (Roxxon's satellite). Hale developed a new form of vibranium called Nuform which turned out to be unstable despite being presented as a suitable substitute, resulting in the Kingpin and Ultron believing that Nuform would be stable but are repelled by Iron Man, the Black Panther and Spider-Man. Hale also conspired with Carlton Drake of the Life Foundation. 
 Samuel Higgins - The Facility Director in Denver. He utilized James Hudson as a power source following his return from Quwrlln. Samuel later recruited Madison Jeffries to assist Windshear on a mission and also presided over the facility developing Omega-32, which was raided by the Beetle.
 Henry Mason - Vice-President of Roxxon.
 Carrington Pax - Executive in Roxxon's West Coast division.
 Huck Petrie - Negotiator of Roxxon.
 Brian Sagar - Vice-President of Roxxon.
 Mike Tappan - Associate director of Roxxon's Los Angeles division.
 Minotaur / Dario Agger - The new CEO of Roxxon.

Former executives
 Michael Brady - Executive of Roxxon's Chemical Division.
 Clayton Burr - Vice President for Roxxon's international development. He supervised Cybertek.
 Brandon Chambers - Executive of Roxxon. He sponsored his brother Phillip's DNA experiments, not realizing that their other brother Mitchell was the subject.
 Mr. Clarkson - Vice President of Roxxon's Texas division. He was killed by Crossbones.
 Ian Forbes - Director of Roxxon's Belfast facility.
 Calvin Halderman - President of Roxxon.
 Curtis Henshaw - Executive of the R&D section at Roxxon's Bolivian facility.
 Jerome "Jerry" Jaxon - Associate Vice President of Special Developments.
 Hugh Jones - Owner, President, and CEO of Roxxon.
 Alexander Jones - The founder and first chairman of Roxxon's predecessor, the Republic Oil and Gas Company. The wealthy oil tycoon founded the company in 1932 as a small business selling engineered oil before being bought by other companies in 1933. Jones ordered the digging of 1,000 acres of land in southern Indiana in 1937. It discovered massive oil amounts and sold the oil to other gas stations and petroleum companies, effectively making it a powerful oil company and turning Jones into a multi-millionaire.
 John T. Gamelin - Director of Foreign Operations, and later the President of the Roxxon Oil Company. He has Hellrazor masquerade as the Black Panther while conspiring with Thomas Agar to discredit Wakanda and obtain vibranium, but the scheme is exposed by Spider-Man and the real Black Panther. Gamelin was also in charge of the Brand Corporation. Gamelin's early appearances never showed his face, just a silhouette of a man wearing eyeglasses and smoking a pipe.

 Terence Gerard - 
 Don Kaminski - President of Roxxon.
 Reuben Kincaid - Executive of Roxxon. He was murdered by Michael Brady.
 Simon Krieger - Vice President of Roxxon's predecessor Republic Oil & Natural Gas. He had arranged the murders of Howard Stark and Maria Stark as part of an attempted takeover of Stark Industries. Krieger next impersonated Tony Stark in order to fool Happy Hogan and Pepper Potts before holding hostages on the Helicarrier but gets exposed by Iron Man, and is killed while in jail.
 Linden Laswell - Executive of Roxxon's Latveria project.
 Aleksander Lukin - Owner of Roxxon Energy Corporation via Kronas Corporation while secretly acting as the Winter Soldier's handler.
 Magma / Jonathan Darque - Project head of Roxxon's division in Temple Corners, VA.

Staff
 Bill - Helicopter pilot for Roxxon's Long Island division.
 Carson - A security operative.
 Chester - A floating oil refinery worker for Roxxon Oil.
 Chief Compton - Supervisor of Roxxon's underground NYC facility.
 Larry Curtiss - A security operative.
 Davis - A scientist who is an assistant to Jonas Harrow.
 Delvecchio - Member of Roxxon's underground NYC facility.
 Jim Dworman - Former Cybertek programmer. He was in charge of Cybertek's shutdown.
 Gail - Secretary to Carrington Pax.
 Gordon - Member of Roxxon's underground NYC facility.
 Grist - Member of Roxxon's underground NYC facility security.
 Jake - A security guard at Roxxon's Denver division.
 Joe - A floating oil refinery worker.
 Juan - An executive assistant to Hale in Roxxon's San Francisco division.
 Ms. Loring - A scientist under Hale and participator in the Nuform project.
 Missy - A Roxxon agent.
 Patrick Nestor - Roxxon's company spokesman.
 Dr. Malachi Oz - A scientist.
 Riki - A boardroom chair at One Roxxon Plaza.
 Sepulchre / Jillian Woods - An agent for Roxxon Blackridge.
 Cindy Shelton - Roxxon's lead researcher.
 "Agger" - An assistant to Huck Petrie.
 Raymond Sikorski - A recruiter with Roxxon Blackridge.
 Miss Simpkins - A secretary at Hydropolis.
 Dr. Ella Sterling - A scientist contractor of Roxxon. She took part in Roxxon's archaeological expedition which resulted in her colleague turned into a Wendigo but is saved by Hulkverine. Sterling is safe thanks to Hulkverine and Doctor Strange fighting the Wendigo, eventually killing the creature. Sterling later runs into Sonia Sung while looking for Hulkverine who throws Sonia and Sterling safely away from Roxxon's capture of Hulkverine. Sterling and Sonia infiltrates Roxxon's facility to help Hulkverine escape from Dario Agger's clutches.
 Michael Thomas - A sleeper agent working at Stark International.
 Ulik - Originally hired by Dario Agger to help level Broxton, hired to be a consultant on the "Inter-Realm Investment Division".
 Walter - An executive assistant to President Gamelin.
 Alvie Walton - Member at Roxxon's Snow Valley service station.
 Chief Wyngard - Roxxon's underground NYC facility supervisor.

Former staff
 Cary Albertson - A scientist on the bio-chip project at Roxxon's Sault Ste. Marie facility.
 Babs Bendix - A secretary.
 Blair - An agent of Roxxon.
 Kenneth H. Bradley - A covert operative and former Brand security member.
 Phillip Chambers - A Roxxon scientist.
 Danger Man / Dan Jermain - A former security inspector for Roxxon.
 Milica Radanovic - A Roxxon scientist specializing in isotope gas chromotography and as mentioned by Mrs. Haggert.
 Abner Doolittle - An Nth Command scientist.
 Roberta "Bobbie" Haggert - A scientist on Roxxon's Omega-32 project. She was assassinated by the Scourge.
 Seth Hanks - A child savant and unwilling employee of Roxxon.
 Paul Hazlett - A scientist.
 Kelly - A security guard at Roxxon's underground NYC facility.
 Kristy - An assistant to Mr. Clarkson. She was murdered by Sin and Crossbones.
 Lewis - A security guard at Roxxon's underground NYC facility.
 Alexander Lipton - A scientist. He was murdered.
 Mischa and Yuri - Roxxon's biochemists.
 Moyer - An agent of Roxxon.
 Duncan O'Neill - A mole within MI-5: British Secret Agent 003.
 Dr. Karl Clark - One of the lead engineers of Roxxon. Died in 1987 from lung cancer after being exposed to radiation while working in one of Roxxon's plants.
 Schroeder - A security guard at Roxxon's underground NYC facility.
 Jack Rollins - A sleeper agent for Nick Fury.
 Steve - A security guard at Long Island Research Complex.

Super-operatives
 Delphine Courtney - An assistant to Jerry Jaxon.
 Cypress - An assassin. He targeted Mikhail and Yuri, but was opposed by Meggan and Shadowcat.
 Dogs of War - Agents of Simon Krieger.
 Afghan -
 Bulldog -
 Doberman -
 Greyhound -
 Labrador -
 Mastiff -
 Rottweiler -
 Shepherd -
 Wolfhound -
 Grasshopper / Douglas Taggert - Armored security.
 Grasshopper / Neil Shelton - Armored security.
 Killer Shrike / Simon Maddicks - Bodyguard of Brand's Jersey branch leader James Melvin.
 Manticore - He original worked under Brand Corp.
 Jason Quartermaster - A superhuman scientist. He worked for Rand-Meachum and was a double agent for Roxxon. He was knocked into his own universal solvent by Luke Cage.
 Saboteur - An armored agent. She acted as an agent of Republic Oil and Natural Gas in an attempt to sabotage Stark Industries but was defeated by Iron Man. She would later be killed by the Grim Reaper.
 Serpent Squad -
 Anaconda / Blanche "Blondie" Sitznski -
 Black Mamba / Tanya Sealy -
 Death Adder / Roland Burroughs - 
 Sidewinder / Seth Voelker -
 S.H.I.E.L.D. Mandroids -
 Stratosfire / Sandy Vincent - Roxxon's superhuman secretary. She was empowered in a similar manner to Sunturion but acted as a hero to improve Roxxon's public image. She was killed by Sunturion activating Roxxon's Zed Control Unit within her armour.
 Windshear / Colin Ashworthe Hume - An enhanced mutant.
 Ogre, Razor Wire and Lightning Fist - Three costumed operatives protecting the company's interests on the island nation of Taino in the Caribbean Sea. They are consumed and destroyed by a mutated zombie virus, and the airborne virus reconstructs their bodies into a skeletal being, which is later destroyed by the Man-Thing.
 Strikeforce B.E.R.S.E.R.K.E.R. - A small platoon of Roxxon's most elite of elite special forces strictly loyal to the company and its shady designs. After hearing Loki's tale, Dario Agger had them drink blood from the heart of a burning dragon, turning them into mystical Hulk-like creatures with strength, toughness and a warrior's fury comparable to both gods and monsters.

Hired agents
 Thomas Agar - 
 Assault & Battery - 
 Anton Aubuisson -  A mercenary of Roxxon who massacres a tribe of Anuquit natives in order to build an oil pipeline but gets thwarted by War Machine.
 Coldblood-7 - 
 Firebolt -  He was hired to destroy the experiments at Project: PEGASUS.
 Fixer -
 Flag-Smasher - A mind-controlled operative.
 Dr. Jonas Harrow - scientist at Rye Research Facility and Roxxon's underground NYC facility.
 Hellrazor - 
 Ivory -
 Mad Dog / Col. Buzz Baxter - 
 Mycroft - 
 Omega Flight - 
 Overrider -  Former S.H.I.E.L.D. agent with the ability to control machinery.
 Smokescream - 
 Spymaster - He was hired by Roxxon to kill the Ghost. Was apparently killed by the Ghost, but later turned up alive.
 Voice - 
 Jennifer Walters / She-Hulk - An attorney.
 Ghost - 
 The Grapplers - They made an attempt to ransack Project: PEGASUS.
 Modular Man - A physicist at Roxxon's Brand Corporation.
 Nth Man - He was about to destroy what remained of the Project. He was also halted.
 Orka - He battled the Avengers in Jamaica, Queens.
 Squadron Supreme -
 Sunturion / Arthur Dearborn - 
 Tarantula / Anton Miguel Rodriguez - 
 Will o' the Wisp - He had his molecules torn apart after Brand's experiment went haywire and was put together by Spider-Man and Dr. Marla Madison. He is still seeking revenge on Brand.

Other versions

Amalgam Comics
Roxxon exists in the Amalgam Universe and is similar to the main Roxxon.

Roxxon 2099
Roxxon is still going strong in the alternate future of 2099 and is one of the major corporations.

Transformers UK
Roxxon exists in the Transformers 120185 reality. Professor Peter Anthony Morris was working for them in Oregon, where he came up with the theory that the Transformers were controlled by oil tycoon G.B. Blackrock. He accidentally kills a Roxxon security guard.

Ultimate Marvel
The Ultimate Marvel version of the Roxxon Corporation is responsible for various immoral activities and is led by inept heir Donald Roxxon. Elijah Stern discovered a way to use vibranium as a power source for the company, but gets fired so Roxxon could take all the credit. This led to villains Vulture, Killer Shrike and Omega Red being sent to harass Donald. Herman Schultz had gotten a hold of design weapons for Roxxon before employment was terminated.

The Roxxon Corporation later got a hold to a sample of the Venom Symbiote which was targeted by the Beetle. When the original Spider-Man fought the Beetle and the vial containing the sample broke, the sample was rendered worthless.

During the Ultimate Enemy storyline, Roxxon Corporation's compound was destroyed by a bio-mass that was secretly created by Reed Richards.

Following the Ultimate Mystery storyline, Roxxon Corporation assembles their personal Roxxon Brain Trust consisting of Doctor Octopus, Dr. Arnim Zola III, Layla Miller, Misty Knight, Samuel Sterns and Nathaniel Essex. The Roxxon Brain Trust was charged with the duty of figuring out the attack that was done to the Baxter Building. Roxxon Corporation was then attacked by the same entity that crushed the entire building.

The Roxxon Corporation secretly used guinea pigs in experiments as super-soldiers (i.e. Bombshell, Spider-Woman, and Cloak and Dagger), as well as an experiment to restore the Venom Symbiote, which gets stolen by Roxxon's biochemist Dr. Conrad Markus. When the new Spider-Man and a group of amateur superheroes all realize they're guinea pigs/super-soldiers, Donald is defeated by Spider-Man and was arrested by S.H.I.E.L.D.

In other media

Television
Roxxon appears in Avengers Assemble, with Roxxon guards voiced by David Kaye, Fred Tatasciore and Jim Meskimen.

Marvel Cinematic Universe
The Roxxon Corporation appears in live-action media set within the Marvel Cinematic Universe:
 In the Marvel One-Shot, A Funny Thing Happened on the Way to Thor's Hammer, S.H.I.E.L.D. Agent Phil Coulson stops at a Roxxon-branded gas station on his way to Albuquerque, New Mexico.
 In the film Iron Man 3 (2013), a Roxxon Norco tanker caused an oil spill, leading to Roxxon accountant Thomas Richards (portrayed by Tom Virtue) being held captive by the Mandarin and seemingly executed on a live broadcast before later parting ways. The aforementioned tanker is later impounded in a shipping yard where Aldrich Killian planned to execute President Matthew Ellis. Simon Krieger was originally slated to appear in early drafts, but was replaced by Killian.
 Roxxon's Cybertek division features in the television series Agents of S.H.I.E.L.D. In the episode "T.R.A.C.K.S.", they supply Ian Quinn with Project Deathlok technology to convert Mike Peterson into a cyborg. In the episode "Ragtag", Coulson leads a S.H.I.E.L.D. team in infiltrating Cybertek to steal files on Project Deathlok, discovering S.H.I.E.L.D.-turned-Hydra agent John Garrett was its first test subject in the process. In the episode "Beginning of the End", the Cybertek manufacturing facility's director Kyle Zeller prepares a team of Deathloks to combat Coulson's team. Following their defeat however, Garrett and Hydra push ahead with their plans while Coulson's team storm Cybertek and take Zeller hostage, believing he was working for Hydra. When Agent Skye discovers Hydra is holding Zeller's wife hostage, she frees her while the rest of the S.H.I.E.L.D. team defeat Garrett's forces. As of the episode "Principia", Cybertek was shut down following Garrett's defeat while ex-S.H.I.E.L.D. Academy student Tony Caine helped fake the Cybertek scientists' deaths to help them find new work, with one of them later providing information to Agent Mack.
 The Roxxon Oil Corporation features in the television series Agent Carter, which takes place in the 1940s. In the episode "Now is Not the End", Roxxon employee Miles Van Ert (portrayed by James Urbaniak) collaborates with Leviathan agents to create more of Howard Stark's destructive Nitramene chemical in a Roxxon refinery. Strategic Scientific Reserve (SSR) operative Peggy Carter infiltrates the facility, but Leviathan operative Leet Brannis uses a Nitramene bomb to implode the refinery. In the episode "Bridge and Tunnel", Roxxon's president Hugh Jones meets with SSR Deputy Director Roger Dooley and Agent Jack Thompson regarding the implosion, concluding that the culprit would be emitting Vita-Rays and later has Van Ert arrested. In the episode "A View in the Dark", Jones and the Council of Nine convince Calvin Chadwick to focus on a senatorial campaign instead of Isodyne Energy. In the episode "The Atomic Job", Peggy infiltrates Roxxon's Los Angeles branch in search of atomic bombs they are holding. Once she discovers the location, she, her partner Edwin Jarvis, and SSR agents infiltrate the facility and disable the bombs before Whitney Frost's group can get the devices.
 Roxxon features in the television series Daredevil. In the episode "Nelson v. Murdock", a flashback depicts Matt Murdock and Foggy Nelson interning at the law firm Landman & Zack, who sued a man who developed cancer while working at a Roxxon plant and claiming the man revealed proprietary secrets. In the episode "Kinbaku", Elektra Natchios breaks into Roxxon's systems to gain information, discovering the company is associated with the Hand.
 Roxxon appears in season one of the television series Cloak & Dagger. In the episode "Suicide Sprints", the Roxxon Gulf Platform's supervisor Nathan Bowen receives an emergency call and attempts to have the facility shut down. However, the platform collapses, releasing energy that would go on to turn Tandy Bowen and Tyrone Johnson as well as Andre Deschaine into superhumans. In the episode "Princeton Offense", Roxxon's greedy Chief Executive of Risk Management Peter Scarborough (portrayed by Wayne Péré) defames Nathan for the accident while Tandy meets with environmentalist employee Mina Hess (portrayed by Ally Maki). In the episode "Funhouse Mirrors", Mina reveals her father Ivan Hess (portrayed by Tim Kang) was a partner of Nathan's who had become catatonic and was hospitalized following the platform's collapse. In the episode "Lotus Eater", Tandy and Tyrone eventually cure Ivan of the trauma and reunite the latter with Mina. In the episode "Colony Collapse", Tandy and Mina confront Scarborough, who reveals he was well aware of the energy underneath the platform and hired an assassin called Ashlie (portrayed by Vanessa Motta) to eliminate anyone who got too close. Eventually, Tandy's powers put Scarborough in a similar catatonic state that Ivan was in and Scarborough is later found by Ashlie.

Video games
 A Roxxon building appears in the background of Spider-Man.
 A Roxxon building appears in Spider-Man: Web of Shadows.
 The Roxxon Corporation appears in the Iron Man 2 film tie-in game.
 The Roxxon Corporation appears in Spider-Man: Shattered Dimensions.
 The Ultimate Marvel version of Roxxon appears in Ultimate Spider-Man: Total Mayhem.
 The Roxxon Corporation appears in Lego Marvel Super Heroes, with Roxxon guards as playable characters.
 The Roxxon Corporation appears in Spider-Man: Miles Morales. Roxxon's head of R&D Simon Krieger commissioned the company's headquarters in Harlem, Roxxon Plaza, which is powered by the clean energy source Nuform. Roxxon also employs a mercenary security force and supervillains such as the Rhino and the Prowler as enforcers. Furthermore, Roxxon's corporate corruption resulted in Nuform's creator Rick Mason trying to expose its deadly properties before being killed by Krieger who took credit for Nuform. This led to Rick's sister Phin adopting the Tinkerer mantle and taking over the Underground criminal group to seek revenge on Roxxon and Krieger. A violent conflict breaks out between the two groups, which Spider-Man works to contain. Amidst this, Krieger also seeks to utilize Roxxon Plaza's Nuform reactor to destroy Harlem. However, Spider-Man and the Tinkerer foil the plot by destroying the aforementioned reactor in their duel. Danika Hart later reports that Roxxon received several lawsuits and Krieger was arrested.

See also
 Alchemax
 Corporation
 Cross Technological Enterprises
 Oscorp
 Parker Industries
 Stark Industries

References

External links
 Roxxon at Marvel.com
 Roxxon Energy Corporation at Marvel Wiki
 Cybertek Systems Inc. at Marvel Wiki
 Roxxon Corporation (Ultimate Marvel) at Marvel Wiki
 
 
 

Fictional organizations in Marvel Comics